WorldView-1 (WV 1) is a commercial earth observation satellite owned by DigitalGlobe. WorldView-1 was launched on 18 September 2007, followed later by the WorldView-2 in 2009. First imagery from WorldView-1 was available in October 2007, prior to the six-year anniversary of the launch of QuickBird, DigitalGlobe's previous satellite.

WorldView-1 was partially financed through an agreement with the National Geospatial-Intelligence Agency (NGA). Some of the imagery captured by WorldView-1 for the NGA is not available to the general public. However, WorldView-1 freed capacity on DigitalGlobe's QuickBird satellite to meet the growing commercial demand for multi-spectral geospatial imagery.

Design
Ball Aerospace built the WorldView-1 satellite bus and camera using an off-axis camera design identical to Quickbird, with the instrument's focal plane being supplied by ITT Exelis. The camera is a panchromatic imaging system featuring half-meter resolution imagery.

Launch
 Launch Date: 18 September 2007
 Launch Time: 18:35 UTC (2:35 p.m. EDT)
 Launch Vehicle: Delta II 7920-10C, s/n D-326
 Launch Site: Space Launch Complex 2 West, Vandenberg Air Force Base, California

See also

 2007 in spaceflight

References

External links
 WorldView-1 at Digitalglobe.com

Commercial imaging satellites of the United States
Spacecraft launched in 2007
Spacecraft launched by Delta II rockets